

Reasonable may refer to:

 Reason, the capacity for rational thinking
 Reasonable accommodation, an adjustment made in a system to accommodate an individual's need
 Reasonable and non-discriminatory licensing, a licensing requirement set by standards organizations
 Reasonable Blackman, a silk weaver in sixteenth-century England
 Reasonable doubt, a legal standard of proof in most adversarial criminal systems
 Reasonable efforts, a criterion in child welfare in the United States
 Reasonable person, a person who exercises care, skill, and appropriate judgment
 Reasonableness, the quality of being a reasonable person
 Subjective and objective standard of reasonableness, legal standards of reasonableness
 Reasonable person model, a psychological model of environments/actions that foster reasonableness
 Reasonable suspicion, a legal standard of proof in United States law
 Reasonable time, amount of time which is in fairness necessary to do something

See also
 Reason (disambiguation)
 Reasonable doubt (disambiguation)